Dunnington is a small unincorporated community in Parish Grove Township, Benton County, in the U.S. state of Indiana.

History

Named for Capt. James Dunn, it stands about one and a half miles west of its smaller sister town, Dunn. A post office was established at Dunnington in 1888, and was discontinued in 1903. In the early 20th century it supported a Catholic church and school, a general store, a Forresters lodge and about half a dozen residences (an estimate similar to the town's current size). St. Mary's Catholic Church, established in the late 19th century, was renovated in the early 1950s and was home to St. Mary's Catholic School, which closed in the late 1960s.

Geography
Indiana State Road 71 passes north through the town, and a small creek named Kult Ditch flows northwest toward Mud Creek.

Notable people
George Gick, baseball player.

References

Unincorporated communities in Benton County, Indiana
Unincorporated communities in Indiana
Lafayette metropolitan area, Indiana
1888 establishments in Indiana